Trevin Jones (born August 4, 1990) is an American mixed martial artist living on the US Territory of Guam, who competes in the Bantamweight division of the Ultimate Fighting Championship.

Background
Jones started his MMA career when he first enrolled in an amateur fight after just six months of jujitsu. Originally from New Orleans, he moved with his family to the island of Guam when he was 13 to be closer to his uncle who was serving in the Marine Corps.

Mixed martial arts career

Early career
With his first pro fight in Pacific Xtreme Combat in 2011 against homegrown fighter Kyle Aguon, Jones fought all off his early career for the PXC promotion, during that time fighting Aguon two more times, taking a loss before beating him out for the Bantamweight belt in 2016.

After winning the belt, Jones had fought challengers from around the world, fighting for organizations such as ACA and Japanese DEEP. During this time, he had a pair of split decision losses against Rodrigo Praia and Young Jin Hwang, results that Jones hotly contests, after which he won by guillotine choke against Mehdi Baidulaev at ACA 91 and rear-naked against Japanese veteran Takafumi Otsuka at Deep: 89 Impact.

Ultimate Fighting Championship

Jones, as a replacement for Mark Striegl on two days notice, faced Timur Valiev on August 22, 2020 at UFC on ESPN: Munhoz vs. Edgar. Jones won the fight via TKO in the second round, completing a comeback after almost getting finished in the first round. This win earned him the Performance of the Night award. On October 7, it was announced that the Nevada State Athletic Commission (NSAC) issued a four and a half month suspension for Trevin Jones, after he tested positive for marijuana in a drug test related to his fight. They also announced that Jones' victory was overturned to a no contest due to the violation. He was fined $1,800 and before he is relicensed in Las Vegas, Jones will also have to pay a prosecution fee of $145.36.

Jones was expected to face Randy Costa on March 6, 2021 at UFC 259. However, Costa withdrew from the bout in mid-February citing injury and was replaced by Mario Bautista. He won the fight via technical knockout in round two.

Jones was scheduled to face Tony Kelley on July 24, 2021 at UFC on ESPN: Sandhagen vs. Dillashaw. However on July 4, Kelly withdrew from the bout due to unknown reasons. As a result, Jones was scheduled to face Aaron Phillips. However on July 18, Phillips had to withdraw from the bout and Jones was moved to UFC on ESPN: Hall vs. Strickland on July 30, 2021 against Ronnie Lawrence. In turn, the bout was cancelled when Lawrence failed to show up for the weigh-ins due to health concerns.

Jones, as a replacement for Jesse Strader, was scheduled to face Mana Martinez at UFC on ESPN: Cannonier vs. Gastelum on August 21, 2021. In turn, Martinez pulled out of the fight and was replaced by Saidyokub Kakhramonov. Jones lost the fight via technical submission due to a guillotine choke in round three.

Jones was scheduled to face Raoni Barcelos on December 18, 2021 at UFC Fight Night 199.  However Jones withdrew from the fight for undisclosed reasons and he was replaced by Victor Henry.

Jones faced Javid Basharat on March 12, 2022 at  UFC Fight Night 203. He lost the bout via unanimous decision.

Jones faced Raoni Barcelos on October 1, 2022 at UFC Fight Night 211. Jones lost the fight by unanimous decision (30-25, 30-27, 30-27) in a one-sided fight.

Jones faced Cody Garbrandt, replacing injured Julio Arce, on March 4, 2023 at UFC 285. He lost the fight via unanimous decision.

Championships and accomplishments

Mixed martial arts
Ultimate Fighting Championship
Performance of the Night (One time) 
Pacific Xtreme Combat
PXC Bantamweight Championship (One time)
MMAjunkie.com
 2020 Comeback of the Year vs. Timur Valiev

Mixed martial arts record

|-
|Loss
|align=center|
|Cody Garbrandt
|Decision (unanimous)
|UFC 285
|
|align=center|3
|align=center|5:00
|Las Vegas, Nevada, United States
|
|-
|Loss
| align=center|13–9 (1)
|Raoni Barcelos
|Decision (unanimous)
|UFC Fight Night: Dern vs. Yan
|
|align=center|3
|align=center|5:00
|Las Vegas, Nevada, United States
|
|-
| Loss
| align=center|13–8 (1)
|Javid Basharat
|Decision (unanimous)
|UFC Fight Night: Santos vs. Ankalaev
|
|align=center|3
|align=center|5:00
|Las Vegas, Nevada, United States
|
|-
| Loss
| align=center|13–7 (1)
|Saidyokub Kakhramonov
|Technical submission (guillotine choke)
|UFC on ESPN: Cannonier vs. Gastelum
|
|align=center|3
|align=center|4:39
|Las Vegas, Nevada, United States
|
|-
| Win
| align=center|13–6 (1)
| Mario Bautista
|TKO (punches)
|UFC 259
|
|align=center|2
|align=center|0:40
|Las Vegas, Nevada, United States
|
|-
|NC
|align=center|
| Timur Valiev
|NC (overturned)
|UFC on ESPN: Munhoz vs. Edgar 
|
|align=center|2
|align=center|1:59
|Las Vegas, Nevada, United States
|
|-
| Win
| align=center|12–6
| Takafumi Otsuka
| Submission (rear-naked choke)
| Deep: 89 Impact
| 
|align=center|2
|align=center|1:40
| Tokyo, Japan
|
|-
| Win
| align=center| 11–6
| Mehdi Baidulaev
| Submission (guillotine choke)
|ACA 91
|
|align=center|1
|align=center|4:37
|Grozny, Russia
|
|-
| Loss
| align=center| 10–6
| Rodrigo Praia
|Decision (split)
|ACB 88
|
|align=center|3
|align=center|5:00
|Brisbane, Australia
|
|-
| Loss
| align=center| 10–5
| Young Jin Hwang
|Decision (split)
|Top FC 18
|
|align=center|3
|align=center|5:00
|Seoul, South Korea
|
|-
| Win
| align=center|10–4
| Jae Hyun So
|TKO (punches)
|Top FC 16
|
|align=center|3
|align=center|0:57
|Incheon, South Korea
|
|-
| Win
| align=center|9–4
| Kyle Aguon
| Decision (split)
| Pacific Xtreme Combat 55
| 
| align=center|3
| align=center|5:00
|Mangilao, Guam
|
|-
| Win
| align=center| 8–4
| Jeremiah Labiano
| KO (punches)
|Pacific Xtreme Combat 52
| 
| align=center|1
| align=center|N/A
| Mangilao, Guam
| 
|-
| Win
| align=center| 7–4
| Mark Abelardo
| Decision (unanimous)
| Pacific Xtreme Combat 49
|
|align=Center|3
|align=center|5:00
|Mangilao, Guam
| 
|-
| Loss
| align=center| 6–4
| Kwan Ho Kwak
|Decision (split)
|Pacific Xtreme Combat 47
|
|align=center|3
|align=center|5:00
|Mangilao, Guam
|
|-
| Win
| align=center|6–3
| Toby Misech
|Decision (split)
|Pacific Xtreme Combat 45
|
|align=center|3
|align=center|5:00
|Mangilao, Guam
|
|-
| Win
| align=center|5–3
| Ricky Camp
| Decision (split)
| Pacific Xtreme Combat 42
| 
| align=center|3
| align=center|5:00
|Mangilao, Guam
|
|-
| Loss
| align=center|4–3
| Alvin Cacdac
| Submission (rear-naked choke)
|Pacific Xtreme Combat 40
| 
| align=center|2
| align=center|0:38
| Mangilao, Guam
| 
|-
| Win
| align=center|4–2
| Troy Bantiag
| Decision (unanimous)
| Pacific Xtreme Combat 37
|
|align=Center|3
|align=center|5:00
|Pasig City, Philippines
|
|-
| Loss
| align=center|3–2
| Kyle Aguon
| Decision (unanimous)
| Pacific Xtreme Combat 36
| 
|align=center|3
|align=center|5:00
| Mangilao, Guam
| 
|-
| Win
| align=center|3–1
| Guzman Pia-Yas
| Submission (rear-naked choke)
| Pacific Xtreme Combat 31
| 
| align=center|1
| align=center|1:40
| Pasig City, Philippines
| 
|-
| Win
| align=center|2–1
| Josh Duenas
|Submission (rear-naked choke)
|Pacific Xtreme Combat 30
|
|align=center|1
|align=center|N/A
|Mangilao, Guam
| 
|-
| Loss
| align=center|1–1
| Justin Cruz
| Decision (unanimous)
| Pacific Xtreme Combat 27
| 
| align=center| 5
| align=center| 5:00
| Mangilao, Guam
|
|-
| Win
| align=center| 1–0
| Kyle Aguon
| Decision (unanimous)
| Pacific Xtreme Combat 23
| 
| align=center| 3
| align=center| 5:00
| Tumon, Guam
|

See also 
 List of current UFC fighters
 List of male mixed martial artists

References

External links 
  
 

1990 births
Living people
Guamanian male mixed martial artists
Bantamweight mixed martial artists
Mixed martial artists utilizing Brazilian jiu-jitsu
Ultimate Fighting Championship male fighters
American practitioners of Brazilian jiu-jitsu
People awarded a black belt in Brazilian jiu-jitsu